Brigitte Adler (22 April 1944 – 25 October 2004) was a German politician of the Social Democratic Party (SPD) and former member of the German Bundestag.

Early life 
Adler was born on 22 April 1944 in Drangstedt, Wesermünde. She attended Wertheim High School, where she completed her intermediary examination. She attended the Heidelberg teacher training college and the Weingarten/Tettnang Primary Teacher's Institute, where she completed Parts I and II of her teacher training examinations.

Career 
She had been a member of the Social Democratic Party (SPD) since 1970. She moved to the German Bundestag in the 1987 federal elections on the Baden-Württemberg state list. She did the same in the 1990 and 1994 parliamentary elections and was a member and secretary of the Committee on Economic Cooperation and Development in the 1994–1998 term.

Literature

References

1944 births
2004 deaths
Members of the Bundestag for Baden-Württemberg
Members of the Bundestag 1998–2002
Members of the Bundestag 1994–1998
Members of the Bundestag 1990–1994
Members of the Bundestag 1987–1990
20th-century German women politicians
Members of the Bundestag for the Social Democratic Party of Germany
21st-century German women politicians
Female members of the Bundestag